The 2020 NME Awards were weld on 12 February 2020 at the O2 Academy Brixton in London and were hosted by comedian Katherine Ryan and radio host Julie Adenuga. The nominations were announced on 20 January 2020.

Among the special awards given, the Glastonbury Festival organizer Emily Eavis received the Godlike Genius Award, Swedish singer and songwriter Robyn received the Songwriter of the Decade Award, British band Arctic Monkeys won Album of the Decade for their 2013 album AM, The 1975 won Band of the Decade and American singer Courtney Love received the Icon Award.

Winners and nominees

Special Awards
 NME Radar Award
 Beabadoobee

 Innovation Award
 The 1975

 Icon Award
 Courtney Love

 Songwriter of the Decade
 Robyn

 Godlike Genius Award
 Emily Eavis

 Album of the Decade
 AM – Arctic Monkeys

 Band of the Decade
 The 1975

 Villain of the Year
 Piers Morgan

 Music Moment of the Year
 BTS – Wembley Stadium

References

External links
Official website

2020 music awards
2020 in London
2020 in British music
Culture in London
New Musical Express